Ustad Ghulam Ali (born 5 December 1940) is a Pakistani ghazal singer of the Patiala Gharana. He has also been a prominent playback singer in Bollywood. Ghulam Ali was a disciple of Bade Ghulam Ali Khan (elder Ghulam Ali Khan). Ali was also trained by Bade Ghulam Ali's younger brothers – Barkat Ali Khan and Mubarak Ali Khan.

Ghulam Ali is considered to be one of the best ghazal singers of his era. His style and variations in singing Ghazals has been noted as unique, as he blends Hindustani classical music with ghazals, unlike any other ghazal singer. Highly popular in Pakistan, India, Afghanistan, Nepal, Bangladesh, as well as among South Asian diaspora in the US, the UK and the Middle Eastern countries.

Many of his hit ghazals have been used in Bollywood movies. His famous ghazals are Chupke Chupke Raat Din, Kal Chaudhvin Ki Raat Thi, Hungama Hai Kyon Barpa, Chamakte Chand Ko, Kiya Hai Pyar Jisé, May Nazar Sé Pee Raha Hoon, Mastana Peeyé, Yé dil yé pagal dil, Apni Dhun Mein Rehta Hoon a ghazal by Nasir Kazmi, "Ham Ko Kiske Gham Ne Maara". His recent album "Hasratein" was nominated in the Best Ghazal Album category at Star GIMA Awards 2014. He was married to Afsana Ali and has a daughter Manjari Ghulam Ali.

In 2015, due to protest by Shiv Sena at Mumbai, his concert was cancelled. After this, he received invitations from Delhi Chief Minister Arvind Kejriwal, West Bengal Chief Minister Mamata Banerjee and Uttar Pradesh Chief Minister Akhilesh Yadav. After this cancellation, he performed at Lucknow, India., New Delhi and in Trivandrum, and Kozhikode, Kerala, India.

In a news item reported in 2015, Ghulam Ali has said that he won't perform in India until situation is right for music.He, however, assured that he will visit India when ‘the atmosphere is right.’ He said that he does not want to be used for political mileage.

His sons Aamir Ghulam Ali and Nazar Ali Abbas are also musicians.

Early life
His name 'Ghulam Ali' was given by his father, a great fan of Bade Ghulam Ali Khan who, in the past, used to live in Lahore. Ghulam Ali had always been listening to Khan since childhood.

Ghulam Ali encountered Ustad Bade Ghulam Ali Khan, for the first time, when he was in his early teens.  Ustad Bade Ghulam Ali Khan had toured Kabul, Afghanistan and, on the way back to India, Ghulam Ali's father requested the Ustad to take his son as a disciple. But Khan insisted that since he was hardly in town, regular training wouldn't be possible. But after repeated requests from Ghulam Ali's father, Ustad Bade Ghulam Ali Khan asked the young Ghulam Ali to sing something. It wasn't easy to have the courage to sing before him. He mustered the courage to sing the Thumri "Saiyyan Bolo Tanik Mose Rahiyo Na Jaye..". After he finished, Ustad hugged him and made him his disciple.

Career
Ghulam Ali started singing for Radio Pakistan, Lahore in 1960. Along with singing ghazals, Ghulam Ali composes music for his ghazals. His compositions are raga-based and sometimes include a scientific mixture of ragas.  He is known for blending gharana-gaayaki into ghazal and this gives his singing the capability to touch people's hearts. He sings Punjabi songs too. Many of his Punjabi songs have been popular and have been part of Punjab's own cultural diaspora. Though from Pakistan, Ghulam Ali remains as popular in India as in Pakistan. Asha Bhosle has done joint music albums with him.

He was introduced to Hindi cinema with a Hindi film song Chupke Chupke Raat Din written by the poet Hasrat Mohani in B. R. Chopra's film, Nikaah (1982). Other popular ghazals include Hungama Hai Kyon Barpa and Awaargi. He tends to select the ghazals of famous poets.

On being questioned about Pakistani pop groups, Ghulam Ali replied, "Frankly, I am really bewildered at their style of singing. How can you sing a song by running and jumping around the stage? The stage is meant for performing not for acrobatics."

Ghulam Ali has also sung some Nepali ghazals like Kina kina timro tasveer, Gajalu tee thula thula aankha, Lolaaeka tee thula and Ke chha ra diun in Nepali language with Narayan Gopal, a well known Nepali singer, and composer Deepak Jangam. Those songs were written by King Mahendra of Nepal. These songs were compiled in an album entitled Narayan Gopal, Ghulam Ali Ra Ma, and are popular among Nepali music lovers to this day.

One of his memorable concerts was at the Taj Mahal. On being asked about the future of ghazal singers, he said he enjoyed popular ghazal singer Adithya Srinivasan's ghazals, who performed the opening act at his concert in 2012 at Bangalore.
Recently, in February 2013, the maestro became the first person to receive the Bade Ghulam Ali Khan award. Commenting on this, he said," I am indebted to the Indian government for giving me this award. For me, it is the greatest award I have received because it is named after my guru."
He also received the first Swaralaya Global Legend Award (2016) at Trivandrum, Kerala, India.
Furthermore, Ghulam Ali was the singer of choice for His late Majesty the king of Nepal Mahendra Birbikram Shah Dev. Ghulam Ali sang a number of popular songs written by King Mahendra.

Notable ghazals/songs
 Aah ko chahiyye ek umr asar honey tak (Poet:  Mirza Ghalib)
 Ae husn-e-beparwah tujhe shola kahoon ya shabnam kahoon (Poet: Bashir Badr)
 Apni Dhun Mein Rehta Hun, Mai Bhi Tere Jaisa Hun (Poet: Nasir Kazmi)
 Apni Tasveer Ko Aankhon Se (Poet: Shahzad Ahmad)
 Arz-e-gham say bhi faaida tou nahin (Poet: Raees Warsi)
 Awaargi (Poet: Mohsin Naqvi)
 Teri Yaad Yaad  (Poet: Sameer)
 Saaqi Sharab Laa 
 Baharon ko Chaman
 Barsan Lagi Sawan Bundiya Raja (Poet: Traditional)
 Bata do tum humein bedaad karna (Poet: Riaz Khairabadi)
 Bechain bahut phirna ghabraaye huye rehna (Poet: Munir Niazi)
 Chamakte Chand Ko Tuta Hua Tara Bana Dala (Poet: Anand Bakshi)
 Chhup Chhupa Ke Piyo
 Chupke Chupke Raat Din (Poet: Hasrat Mohani)
 Dard-e-dil dard aashna jaane (Poet: Bahadur Shah Zafar)
 Dareeche Be-sada Koi Nahin Hai (Poet: Sabir Zafar)
 Dil Buk Buk Ahro
 Dil Jala Ke Mera Muskuraate Hain Woh
 Dil dhadakne ka sabab yaad aaya (Poet: Nasir Kazmi)
 Dil Mein Ek Leher Si Uthi Hai Abhi (Poet: Nasir Kazmi)
 Fasle Aise Bhi Honge (Poet: Adeem Hashmi)
 Gajalu Ti Thula Thula Aankha (Poet: King Mahendra of Nepal)
 Hadaff-e-Gham na kiya sang-e-mallamat nay mujhay   (Poet: Raees Warsi)
 Heer (Punjabi Traditional)
 Hum Tere Shahar Mein Aaye Hain Musafir Ki Tarha
 Hum To Kitnon Ko Mahzabeen Kehte Hain
 Humko Kiske Gham Ne Mara (Poet: Masroor Anwar)
 Hungama Hai Kyon Barpa (Akbar Allahabadi)
 Itni muddat baad mile ho (Poet: Mohsin Naqvi)
 Jin ke honton pe hansi
 Kachhi Deewar Hoon Thokar Na Lagana
 Kaisi Chali Hai Abke Hawa
 Kal Chaudhvin Ki Raat Thi (Poet: Ibn-e-Insha)
 Kal Raat Bazm mein jo mila
 Kina Kina Timro Tasveer (Poet: King Mahendra of Nepal)
 Kehte Hain Mujhse Ishq Ka Afsana Chahiye  (Qamar Jalalabadi)
 Khuli Jo Aankh (Poet: Farhat Shehzad)
 Khushboo Gunche Talash Karti Hai
 Khushboo Jaise Log Mile
 Ki Pucchde Ho Haal (Punjabi song)
 Kiya Hai Pyaar Jise (Poet: Qateel Shifai)
 koi humnafas nahi hai
 koi ummid bar nahi aati (Poet: Ghalib)
 Lolayeka ti thula (Nepali Song)
 Main Nazar Se Pee Raha Hoon
 Mehfil Mein Baar Baar (Agha Bismil)
 Mere shoq da nai aitbar tenu  Poet: Ghulam Mustafa Tabassum
 Niyat-e-shauq bhar na jaaye kahin (Composed by Mohsin Raza Poet: Nasir Kazmi)
 Ni Chambe Diye Bandh Kaliye (Punjabi song)
 Nit de vichore sada (Punjabi song)
Pata laga mainu huun ki judai (Punjabi song)
 Patta Patta Boota Boota (Poet: Meer Taqi Meer)
 Paara Paara Hua Pairaahan-e-Jaan     (Poet: Syed Razid-e-Ramzi)
 Pehli waari aj hona (Punjabi song)
 Phir Kisi Rahguzar Par Shahyad (Poet: Ahmed Faraz)
 Phir Sawan Rut Ki Pawan Chali, Tum Yaad Aaye (Poet: Nasir Kazmi)
 Rabba Mere Haal Da (Punjabi song)
 "Rahe ishq ki inteha chahata hoon"
 Ranj Ki Jab Guftagu Hone Lagi (Poet: Daag Dehlavi)
 Roya Karenge Aap Bhi (Poet: Momin Khan Momin)
 Shauq Har Rang Raqeeb-E-Sar-O-Samaan Nikla (Poet: Ghalib)
 Tak Patri Waaleya Lekh Mere (Punjabi song)
 Tamaam Umr Tera Intezar Kiya (Poet: Hafeez Hoshiarpuri)
 Tumhare Khat Mein Naya Ik Salaam Kis Ka Thaa (Poet: Daag Dehlavi)
 Woh Kabhi Mil Jayen Tau (Poet: Akhtar Sheerani)
 Woh Jo Hum Mein Tum Mein Qarar Tha (Poet: Momin Khan Momin)
 Yeh Batein Jhooti Batein Hain Poet: Ibn-e-Insha
 Yeh Dil Yeh Pagal Dil (Poet: Mohsin Naqvi)
 Zakhm-e-Tanhai Mein Khusboo-e-Heena Kiski Thi 
Zehaal-e-miskin mukun taghaful (Poet: Amir Khusroo)

Discography
 Tere Shehar Mein – 1996
 Lamha Lamha – 1997
 Mahtab – 1997
 Madhosh – 1999
 Khushboo – 2000
 Rabba Yaar Milaade – 2000
 Passions – 2000
 Sajda – 2001
 Visaal – 2004
 Aabshaar – 2006
 Parchhaiyan – 2006
 Husn-E-Ghazal – 2007
 The Enchanter – 2010
 Anjuman Behtareen Ghazalein
 At His Very Best Ghulam Ali
 Aawargee
 Dillagee
 Ghazalain – Live at Islamabad
 Ghazals
 Great Ghazals
 Geet Aur Ghazals
 Hungama Live in Concert Vol.1
 Haseen Lamhe
 Khwahish
 Live in USA Vol 2 – Private Mehfil Series
 Live in USA Vol 1 – Private Mehfil Series
 Mast Nazren -Ecstatic Glances Live in London, 1984
 Narayan Gopal, Ghulam Ali Ra Ma (Nepali Ghazals)
 Once More
 Poems of Love
 Saadgi
 Suraag – In Concert
 Suno
 Soulful
 Saugaat
 The Golden Moments – Patta Patta Boota Boota
 The Finest Recordings of Ghulam Ali
 The Golden Collection
 With Love
 Kalaam-E-Mohabbat (Ghazals written by Sant Darshan Singh Ji)
 Chupke Chupke – Live in Concert, England
 Rang Tarang vol 1,2
 Janay Walay
 Heer
 Ghulam Ali – The Very Best
 Ghulam Ali – Mehfil – Collection From Live Concerts
 The Best of Ghulam Ali
 Awargi—Ghulam Ali – Vocal CDNF418/419 Live. Vol.3 & 4.
 Aitbaar
 Aadaab Ustad (Ghazals)
 Ghulam Ali Vol.1 and 2
 A Ghazal Treat – Ghulam Ali in Concert;;
 Ghulam Ali in Concert
 Awargi (Live) Vol 1 and 2
 Moods and Emotions
 Ek Ehsaas – A Confluence of the Finest Ghazal Voices 
 Best of Ghulam Ali
 Greatest Hits Of Ghulam Ali
 The Golden Moments Ghulam Ali (Vol.1)
 A Live Concert
 The Best of Ghulam Ali
 Once More
 Mehraab
 Ghulam Ali Live at India Gate – Swar Utsav 2001 – Songs of the Wandering Soul
 Ghalib – Ghazals – Ghulam Ali – Mehdi Hassan
 The Latest, the best"\
 Meraj-E-Ghazal, Ghulam Ali & Asha Bhosle

Awards and recognition
Pride of Performance Award in 1979 by the President of Pakistan
Sitara-i-Imtiaz Award (Star of distinction) in 2013 by the President of Pakistan

References

External links

1940 births
Living people
Pakistani ghazal singers
Pakistani classical singers
Classical music in Pakistan
Pakistani folk singers
Performers of Sufi music
Pakistani male singers
Pakistani Sunni Muslims
People from Sialkot
Punjabi people
Nepali-language singers
Pakistani playback singers
Recipients of the Pride of Performance
Recipients of Sitara-i-Imtiaz
Patiala gharana